Bembidion caucasicum is a species of ground beetle from the Trechinae subfamily that can be found in Armenia, Bosnia and Herzegovina, Bulgaria, Georgia, Greece, Lebanon, North Macedonia, Russia, Serbia and Turkey.

References

Beetles described in 1844
Beetles of Asia
Beetles of Europe